Patrick Lawrence Brady (16 March 1895 – 1 May 1944) was a former Australian rules footballer who played with Melbourne in the Victorian Football League (VFL).	

Brady was awarded the Meritorious Service Medal during World War I and served again in World War II. He died from illness while on active service on 1 May 1944.

Notes

External links 

1895 births
Australian rules footballers from Melbourne
Melbourne Football Club players
Australian military personnel of World War I
Australian Army personnel of World War II
1944 deaths
Australian Army officers
Recipients of the Meritorious Service Medal (United Kingdom)
Military personnel from Melbourne